Maxmagnus is an Italian comics series featuring an eponymous character, created in 1968 by Italian comic book creator Max Bunker and comics artist Magnus, for the magazine Eureka.

Publication history
Maxmagnus was published in 1968–1970 in the form of 4/6-panels short histories, and the issued in a regular series in the 1980s, with art by Leone Cimpellin.

Maxmagnus  was also published in French and Croatian.

References

Italian comics
Italian comics titles
Italian comics characters
1968 comics debuts
Fictional kings
Humor comics
Satirical comics
Comics set in the Middle Ages
Fictional medieval European people
Comics characters introduced in 1968